The Heights of Abraham is an electronica collaboration based in Sheffield and Kingston upon Hull, Yorkshire in North-East England. Formed in the mid-1990s by Steve Cobby, Sim Lister and Jake Harries, they play electronica, ambient techno, and chill out.

Formed in 1992 their debut releases (Tides EP and Humidity LP) came in 1992 on the ambient-downtempo label Pork Recordings (also based in Hull). With David McSherry; who forms Fila Brazillia with Cobby; Cobby and Lister created their own music label, Twentythree Records.

Their album Electric Hush was voted one of the 'Top 20 Dance Albums' of 1995 by dance and club-culture magazine, Mixmag.

In February 2013 (bar the Electric Hush album), Heights of Abraham moved to Steel Tiger Records.

Discography

Studio albums 
Two Thousand and Six (Twentythree Records, 2005)
Electric Hush (ZTT, 1998, reissue)
Electric Hush (Pork Recordings, 1995)
Humidity (Pork Recordings, 1993)

EPs 
Tides EP (Pork Recordings, 1992)

Compilations 
Zambient One, ZTT's very personal collection of modern-day lullabies (and wake-up calls) - ZTT, June 2013
Fila Brazillia: The Garden Compilation Vol. 1 - Matrix Musik (2005)
Pork Chops - Kudos (2003)
Best Of Café Del Sol - Water Music Records (2002)
Visions Of Ibiza - Beechwood Music (2001)
Chill Out In The City - Water Music Records (2001)
The Future Sound Of Ambient Vol I & II - BNE (2000)
Freezone 2 - Variations on a Chill SSR Records (1995)

See also 
 List of independent UK record labels
 List of electronic music record labels
 The Cutler

External links 
Zambient One, ZTT's very personal collection of modern day lullabies (and wake-up calls) features Dolphins, a track by Heights of Abraham - released by ZTT, June 2013
Heights of Abraham official web site
'Electric Hush' by The Heights of Abraham voted a Top 20 Dance Album 1995 by Mixmag
https://www.techno.de/mixmag/97.11/Pork.a.html Techo.de Archived from the original.
Heights of Abraham Discography

British electronic music groups